Altet is a locality located in the municipality of Tàrrega, in Province of Lleida province, Catalonia, Spain. As of 2020, it has a population of 101.

Geography 
Altet is located 58km east of Lleida.

References

Populated places in the Province of Lleida